The 47th Separate Mechanized Brigade is a brigade of the Ukrainian Ground Forces formed in 2022.

History 
The 47th Separate Mechanized Brigade was formed from the 47th Separate Assault Battalion, established on April 26th, 2022 with volunteers from Kyiv, Dnipro, Odesa, and Lviv. The Battalion was led by Ivan Shalamaga with Valeriy Markus serving as the Head Master Sergeant. The Battalion was equipped by May 8th and took part in the Battle of Vuglegirska TEC in the Donetsk region. On June 28th, 2022, the Battalion was expanded to a separate assault regiment with the addition of tank, artillery, and fire support units. The Regiment underwent restructuring from October 13th to November 15th, 2022 to become the 47th Separate Mechanized Brigade equipped with M-55S, Panthera T6, and M2A2 ODS Bradleys.

Structure 
As of 2023 the brigade's structure is as follows:

 47th Separate Mechanized Brigade, N/A
 Headquarters & Headquarters Company
 1st Mechanized Battalion
 2nd Mechanized Battalion
 3rd Mechanized Battalion
 Tank Battalion
 Artillery Group
 Anti-Aircraft Defense Battalion
 Reconnaissance Company
 Engineer Battalion
 Maintenance Battalion
 Logistic Battalion
 Signal Company
 Radar Company
 Medical Company
 CBRN Protection Company

References 

Military units and formations of the 2022 Russian invasion of Ukraine
Military units and formations of Ukraine
Military of Ukraine